Hay Creek is a stream in Beltrami County, Minnesota, in the United States.

Hay Creek was so named from the fact early settlers saw haystacks there which had been made by Indians.

See also
List of rivers of Minnesota

References

Rivers of Minnesota
Rivers of Beltrami County, Minnesota